Austin House may refer to:

Guyana
Austin House (Guyana), official residence of the Anglican Bishop of Guyana

United States
Hiram B. Austin House, Mon Louis Island, Alabama, listed on the National Register of Historic Places in Mobile County, Alabama
A. Everett Austin House, Hartford, Connecticut, listed on the NRHP in Hartford County, Connecticut
Austin House (Sarasota, Florida), listed on the National Register of Historic Places in Manatee County, Florida
Austin-Hennessey Homestead, Wells, Maine, listed on the National Register of Historic Places in York County, Maine
Drury-Austin House, Boyds, Maryland, listed on the NRHP in Maryland
Francis B. Austin House, Boston, Massachusetts, listed on the NRHP in Massachusetts
Cooper-Frost-Austin House, Cambridge, Massachusetts, listed on the NRHP in Massachusetts
Austin-McDonald House, Aztec, New Mexico, listed on the National Register of Historic Places listings in San Juan County, New Mexico
Austin, Nichols and Company Warehouse, Brooklyn, New York, listed on the National Register of Historic Places in Kings County, New York
Richard Austin House, Ossining, New York, listed on the National Register of Historic Places in Westchester County, New York
 William Austin House (Trumansburg, New York), listed on the NRHP in Tompkins County, New York
Eliphalet Austin House, Austinburg, Ohio, listed on the NRHP in Ohio
Austin-Magie Farm and Mill District, Oxford, Ohio, listed on the NRHP in Ohio
John Alexander Austin House, Memphis, Tennessee, listed on the National Register of Historic Places listings in Shelby County, Tennessee
Thomas Austin House, Lehi, Utah, listed on the National Register of Historic Places in Utah County, Utah
 William Austin House (Park City, Utah), listed on the National Register of Historic Places in Summit County, Utah

See also
Austin Hall (disambiguation)
Austin Building (disambiguation)
Austin Historic District (disambiguation)